Torment is a 1924 American silent crime drama film produced and directed by Maurice Tourneur and distributed by Associated First National. This film stars Bessie Love, Owen Moore, and Jean Hersholt. The film is based on a story by William Dudley Pelley with script by Fred Myton and titles by Marion Fairfax. It is a lost film.

Plot
Count Boris Romanoff (Hersholt), a modern-day Robin Hood, has stolen the Russian crown jewels with the intent of selling them and giving the proceeds to the poor. However, a group of thieves led by Hansen (Moore) learns of this plan, and plots to steal the jewels in Yokohama before they can be sold. On a ship to Japan, Hansen meets a maid named Marie (Love), who convinces him to change his ways.

While in Yokohama, an earthquake levels the city, killing the count, and trapping Hansen, his fellow thieves, and Marie in a bank vault. Hansen and Marie fall in love, and Hansen vows to follow through with the count's wishes.

Cast

Production
A production crew filmed scenes in Russia and Japan, as well as the United States, so that the scenes that took place in those locales would have an authenticity. The film also incorporated documentary footage of the 1923 Great Kantō earthquake.

References

External links

 
 
 
 Lobby poster

1924 crime drama films
1920s disaster films
1924 lost films
1924 films
American black-and-white films
American crime drama films
American disaster films
American silent feature films
Films about earthquakes
Films based on short fiction
Films directed by Maurice Tourneur
First National Pictures films
Lost American films
Lost crime drama films
1920s American films
Silent American drama films
1920s English-language films
English-language drama films